The Porsche Junioren are a team of young racing drivers, employed by Porsche and driving for various private teams, as Porsche officially retired from factory racing after winning the 1998 24 Hours of Le Mans overall with the Porsche 911 GT1. The current Porsche Junioren are Sven Muller of Germany, Matteo Cairoli of Italy, Mathieu Jaminet of the France, Dennis Olsen of Norway, Matt Campbell of New Zealand and Thomas Preining of Austria. 

Porsche supports its customer teams not only with  race cars, but also voluntarily with talented young race drivers, who drive in many race series worldwide and furthermore support the advancement of the race cars.
Porsche gives its works drivers room for improvement and advancement with contracts lasting for several years. To be a Porsche works driver means to have a full-time job, participating in up to 25 races a year, among them many endurance races, and often in different race car models. Former Porsche Junior drivers include Dirk Muller, Thierry Boutsen, Randy Pobst, Johnny Mowlem, Romain Dumas, Timo Bernhard, Joerg Bergmeister, Patrick Long, and Bob Wollek.

Results 
The 2006 24 Hours Nürburgring was won by Lucas Luhr, Timo Bernhard, Mike Rockenfeller, and Marcel Tiemann in a Porsche 911 GT3-MR.

External links
Web site

Junioren
Porsche Supercup teams